Liberty Playing Card Company is a Texas-based company which produces custom-made playing cards.

Liberty was started in 1970 in Chicago.  In the late-1970s, it moved down to Arlington, Texas.  In the late 1980s, all of the playing card assets of Western Playing Card Co. (Western Publishing) brands such as Guild, Colortone, Invincible, Imperial, Boulevard, Western, Whitman etc. were acquired.  In 2003, they produced the most-wanted Iraqi playing cards for the United States government.  They also made a set of cards parodying the most wanted Iraqi cards, which featured US government officials.

At present, the Liberty Playing Card Company is a subsidiary of Gambler's Warehouse, located at 202 N Great SouthWest Parkway, Grand Prairie, Texas.  Liberty manufacturers playing cards, trading cards and games and poker chips, with a focus on specialty advertising decks for businesses.  Gambler's Warehouse is a major online retailer of playing cards and related casino supplies, such as security boxes, chip trays, table layouts, roulette wheels, craps equipment and more.

See also

References

External links

Official site - Gambler's Warehouse

Playing card manufacturers
Manufacturing companies established in 1970
1970 establishments in Illinois
Companies based in Illinois